Leandro Mariano da Silva (born 11 December 1989), known as just Leo, is a Brazilian striker.

Career
Leo began his career in his hometown with Brusque joined than in summer 2008 to FK Siad Most, he played his one and only game in Czech Republic in the Druhá liga on 1 November 2008 against 1. HFK Olomouc.

On 26 February 2009 he moved from FK Siad Most to Politehnica Iași, signing a sixth month contract between 30 June 2009.

References

External links
 Profile by Polithnica Iasi 
 FK Siad Most Profile
CBF 

1989 births
Living people
Brazilian footballers
Brazilian expatriate footballers
Brusque Futebol Clube players
FC Politehnica Iași (1945) players
Expatriate footballers in the Czech Republic
Expatriate footballers in Romania
Association football forwards